The Baluchi Autonomist Movement (BAM) was an ethnic Baluchi guerrilla movement in Iranian Balochistan during the 1980s. The movement was supported by the Iraqi government. The BAM's main demands were limited autonomy and economic concessions for Iranian Baluchis. After the Iran–Iraq War, the BAM members fled to neighboring Arab Persian Gulf nations, which led to the dissolution of the group. Today it is believed that BAM divided into many groups, one of them being Jundallah, previously known as Jondollah.

See also

 Jundallah
 Iran–Iraq War
 People's Mujahedin of Iran

References
 Albert J. Jongman, Alex Peter Schmid. Political Terrorism: A New Guide to Actors, Authors, Concepts, Data Bases, Theories, & Literature. Transaction Publishers, 2005. , 

Baloch nationalist militant groups
Baloch people
1980s in Iran
National liberation movements
Paramilitary organisations based in Iran
Balochistan
Nationalist organizations
Militant opposition to the Islamic Republic of Iran